Max Geller may refer to:

 Max Geller (wrestler) (born 1971), Israeli Olympic wrestler
 Max Geller (artist) (born 1984), American performance artist